Between 1980 and 1989, there were 58 Thor missiles launched, of which 56 were successful, giving a 96.6% success rate.

Launch statistics

Rocket configurations

Launch sites

Launch outcomes

1980
There were 5 Thor missiles launched in 1980. 4 of the 5 launches were successful, giving an 80% success rate.

1981
There were 7 Thor missiles launched in 1981. All 7 launches were successful.

1982
There were 8 Thor missiles launched in 1982. All 8 launches were successful.

1983
There were 10 Thor missiles launched in 1983. All 10 launches were successful.

1984
There were 6 Thor missiles launched in 1984. All 6 launches were successful.

1986
There were 4 Thor missiles launched in 1986. 3 of the 4 launches were successful, giving a 75% success rate.

1987
There were 4 Thor missiles launched in 1987. All 4 launches were successful.

1988
There were 3 Thor missiles launched in 1988. All 3 launches were successful.

1989
There were 9 Thor missiles launched in 1989. All 9 launches were successful.

References 

 
 

Lists of Thor and Delta launches
Lists of Thor launches
Lists of Delta launches